Girard is an unincorporated community and census-designated place (CDP) in Kent County, Texas, United States. The population was 50 at the 2010 census.

Geography
Girard is located in northeastern Kent County at  (33.362386, -100.663842), along Texas State Highway 70.

Demographics
As of the census of 2000, there were 62 people, 21 households, and 16 families residing in the CDP. The population density was 42.4 people per square mile (16.4/km2). There were 28 housing units at an average density of 19.2/sq mi (7.4/km2). The racial makeup of the CDP was 91.94% White, 8.06% from other races. Hispanic or Latino of any race were 8.06% of the population.

There were 21 households, out of which 38.1% had children under the age of 18 living with them, 71.4% were married couples living together, 4.8% had a female householder with no husband present, and 23.8% were non-families. 23.8% of all households were made up of individuals, and 23.8% had someone living alone who was 65 years of age or older. The average household size was 2.95 and the average family size was 3.56.

In the CDP, the population was spread out, with 32.3% under the age of 18, 6.5% from 18 to 24, 22.6% from 25 to 44, 14.5% from 45 to 64, and 24.2% who were 65 years of age or older. The median age was 39 years. For every 100 females, there were 72.2 males. For every 100 females age 18 and over, there were 100.0 males.

The median income for a household in the CDP was $24,500, and the median income for a family was $30,417. Males had a median income of $23,333 versus $41,250 for females. The per capita income for the CDP was $9,653. There were 17.6% of families and 19.2% of the population living below the poverty line, including 22.2% of under eighteens and 80.0% of those over 64.

Education
Girard is served by the Jayton-Girard Independent School District.

References

External links

Census-designated places in Kent County, Texas
Census-designated places in Texas